Jule Böwe (born Kathrin Cammann, 1969) is a German actress. She has appeared in more than thirty films since 1999.

Biography 
Jule Böwe, born as the child of a psychiatrist and neurologist couple, took her first name Jule in a student dormitory after the statement of a roommate. While still in the GDR, she first trained as an occupational therapist and worked in this profession until 1992 in the "home for the injured" in Berlin-Lichtenberg and in the special hospital in Berlin-Charlottenburg. Already during her training in Wismar she played in a student theater group. She applied to some acting schools, but failed all entrance exams.

Selected filmography

References

External links 

1969 births
Living people
German film actresses